The Big Breaker is the most northerly geographic feature in the Houtman Abrolhos islands in the Indian Ocean off the west coast of Australia. It is located at the extreme tip of a reef that extends about three kilometres north of North Island. It is so named because it is a breaker, a portion of submerged reef over which waves break.

References

Houtman Abrolhos
Reefs of the Indian Ocean
North Island (Houtman Abrolhos)